Foolish Thing Desire is the second solo album by the English musician Daniel Ash. It was released in 1992. It was a success on Billboard'''s Alternative Albums chart. Ash supported the album with a North American tour.

Critical reception

The Calgary Herald deemed the album "boring as hell." Newsday wrote that "songs such as 'Here She Comes Again' and 'The Hedonist' spotlight Ash's no-holds-barred guitar style." The Philadelphia Inquirer'' concluded that "'Bluebird', perhaps the only song of interest on this 10-cut disc, finds Ash masquerading as a goth Kenny Loggins."

Track listing 
All songs written by Daniel Ash, except 4, 8 and 9 (Ash, John A. Rivers)
 Here She Comes 4:51
 Foolish Thing Desire 5:27
 Bluebird 5:11
 Dream Machine 6:54
 Get Out of Control 4:25
 The Void 5:39
 Roll On 5:30
 Here She Comes Again 5:51
 The Hedonist 6:44
 Higher Than This 3:47
 Paris '92 (exclusive to Japanese Version)
 Acid Rain (exclusive to Japanese Version)
 Firedance (exclusive to Japanese Version)

Personnel
Daniel Ash: Vocals, Guitars, Keyboards, Bass
John A. Rivers: Keyboards and Drum Programming, Bass on "Here She Comes" and "Dream Machine"
Sylvan Richardson: Bass on "Here She Comes"
Natacha Atlas: Backing Vocals on "Bluebird"
She Rocola: Backing Vocals on "Here She Comes"

References

Daniel Ash albums
1992 albums
Beggars Banquet Records albums